Internal Punishment Programs is the seventh album by industrial metal band Red Harvest. It was released in 2004.

Track listing
All songs written and arranged by Red Harvest.
 Anatomy of the Unknown – 3:28
 Fall of Fate – 4:15
 Abstract Morality Junction – 2:58
 Mekanizm – 4:15
 Symbol of Decay – 7:23
 Teknocrate – 3:49
 Synthesize My DNA – 4:04
 Wormz – 2:57
 4-4-1-8 – 1:43
 Internal Punishment Programs – 4:43

Bonus Video: "Anatomy of the Unknown" – 3:34

Personnel
Ofu Khan: Vocals, Guitars
Kjetil "TurboNatas" Eggum: Guitars
Lars "LRZ" Sørensen: Keyboards, Synthesizers, Sampling, Keyboard and Synth Programming
Thomas Brandt: Bass
Erik Wroldsen: Drums

References

External links
 Red Harvest's official website

 

2004 albums
Red Harvest (band) albums